The Central Bank of Malta is the central bank of the Republic of Malta.  It was established on 17 April 1968. In May 2004, when Malta joined the European Union, it became an integral part of the European System of Central Banks. Until 2008, the bank was responsible for the former national Maltese currency, the liretta. It became a part of the Eurosystem when it adopted the euro on 1 January, 2008.

The Central Bank of Malta Act was originally published by means of Act XXXI of 1967. It has been amended a number of times, most recently by Acts I and IV of 2007 in order to provide for the bank's membership within the Eurosystem.

The Central Bank of Malta is located in an early 20th-century building. Completed in 1924 as the Vernon Institute, or Vernon Club. The bank occupied the building since 1967, but made arrangement for the lease of the premises in 1968, with a contract lasting almost hundred years. The interior was eventually demolished in 1968, keeping the façade, to be redeveloped and housing the present Central Bank of Malta. In 2004, the building was bought from the Government of Malta by the bank.

Governors
Governors of the Central Bank of Malta since 1968.
Philip L. Hogg: 17 April 1968 – 31 March 1972
Borge Andersen: 1 April 1972 – 16 March 1973
R.J.A. Earland: 17 March 1973 – 25 January 1974
Henry C. de Gabriele: 1 September 1985 – 6 November 1986 (acting)
Anthony P. Galdes: 3 June 1987 – 2 June 1993
Francis J. Vassallo: 15 September 1993 – 30 September 1997
Emanuel Ellul: 1 October 1997 – 30 September 1999
Michael C. Bonello: 1 October 1999 – 30 June 2011
Josef Bonnici: 1 July 2011 – 30 June 2016
Mario Vella: 1 July 2016 - 31 December 2020
Edward Scicluna: 1 January 2021 - Incumbent

Further reading

See also
Economy of Malta
Maltese lira

References

External links

 Central Bank of Malta Act or Cap. 204 of the Laws of Malta

Malta
Banks of Malta
Malta
1968 establishments in Malta
Banks established in 1968